This is a list of liberal arts colleges in the United States. Liberal arts colleges in the United States are usually four-year colleges which lead students to a bachelor's degree; some, such as Augsburg University and Point Loma Nazarene University, lead students to obtaining a master's or doctoral degree.

These schools are American institutions of higher education which have traditionally emphasized interactive instruction (although research is still a component of these institutions). They are known for being residential and for having smaller enrollment, class size, and student-teacher-ratios than universities. These colleges also encourage a high level of teacher-student interaction at the center of which are classes taught by full-time faculty, rather than graduate student teaching assistants who often teach classes at large research-oriented universities. The colleges may be coeducational or single-sex, private or public, and either secular or affiliated with a religious body. Some are historically black colleges. Some offer experimental curricula.

Alabama 
Birmingham–Southern College
Huntingdon College
Judson College (closed)
Miles College
Spring Hill College
Stillman College
Talladega College
University of Montevallo

Arizona
Arizona International College (closed)
Harrison Middleton University
Ottawa University
Prescott College
Sessions College for Professional Design

Arkansas
Central Baptist College
Harding University
Henderson State University
Hendrix College
John Brown University
Lyon College
Ouachita Baptist University
University of the Ozarks

California 
California Lutheran University

Claremont Colleges
Claremont McKenna College
Harvey Mudd College
Pitzer College
Pomona College
Scripps College
Concordia University, Irvine
Deep Springs College (2-year-only program, leading to associate degree)
La Sierra University
The Master's University

Mills College
Mount St. Mary's College
Occidental College
Pacific Union College
Point Loma Nazarene University
Providence Christian College
Saint Mary's College of California
San Diego Christian College
Soka University of America
Sonoma State University
Thomas Aquinas College
University of Redlands
Westmont College
Whittier College

Colorado 

Adams State University
Colorado College
Fort Lewis College
Naropa University
United States Air Force Academy
Western State Colorado University

Connecticut 

Albertus Magnus College
Connecticut College
Eastern Connecticut State University
Mitchell College
Quinnipiac University
Trinity College
University of Saint Joseph
Wesleyan University

Florida 
Ave Maria University
Bethune–Cookman University
Eckerd College
Flagler College
New College of Florida
Palm Beach Atlantic University
Rollins College
Saint Leo University
Southeastern University
Stetson University
Warner University

Georgia 
Agnes Scott College
Berry College
Covenant College
Emmanuel College
Georgia College and State University
Georgia Gwinnett College
Mercer University

Morehouse College
Morris Brown College
Oglethorpe University
Piedmont University
Point University
Ralston College
Reinhardt University
Spelman College
Toccoa Falls College
Wesleyan College
Young Harris College

Idaho
College of Idaho
New Saint Andrews College
Northwest Nazarene University

Illinois 
Augustana College
Aurora University
Blackburn College
College of the University of Chicago
Columbia College Chicago
Elmhurst University
Eureka College
Greenville University
Illinois College
Illinois Wesleyan University
Judson University
Knox College
Lake Forest College
MacMurray College
McKendree University
Millikin University
Monmouth College
North Central College
North Park University
Olivet Nazarene University
Principia College
Quincy University
Rockford University
Shimer College
Trinity Christian College
Trinity International University
Wheaton College

Indiana 
Anderson University
Bethel University
DePauw University
Earlham College
Franklin College
Goshen College
Grace College
Hanover College
Huntington University
 Indiana Wesleyan University
Manchester University
Marian University
Saint Joseph's College (closed)
Saint Mary-of-the-Woods College
Saint Mary's College
Taylor University
University of Evansville
University of Saint Francis
Wabash College

Iowa 
Briar Cliff University
Central College
Clarke University
Coe College
Cornell College
Dordt University
Graceland University
Grand View University

Grinnell College
Iowa Wesleyan University
Loras College
Luther College
Morningside University
Mount Mercy University
Northwestern College
Simpson College
Waldorf College
Wartburg College

Kansas 
Baker University
Benedictine College
Bethany College
Bethel College
Central Christian College of Kansas
Fort Hays State University
Kansas Wesleyan University
McPherson College
MidAmerica Nazarene University
Ottawa University
Sterling College
Washburn University

Kentucky 
Alice Lloyd College
Asbury University
Bellarmine University
Berea College
Campbellsville University
Centre College
Georgetown College
Kentucky Wesleyan College
Lindsey Wilson College
Midway University
St. Catharine College
Thomas More University
Transylvania University
Union College
University of the Cumberlands
University of Pikeville

Louisiana 
Centenary College of Louisiana
Dillard University
Louisiana Christian University
Xavier University of Louisiana
 University of Holy Cross

Maine

Bates College
Bowdoin College
Colby College
College of the Atlantic
Saint Joseph's College of Maine
Unity College
University of Maine at Farmington
University of Maine at Fort Kent

Maryland 
Goucher College
Hood College
McDaniel College
Mount Saint Mary's University
Notre Dame of Maryland University
St. John's College
St. Mary's College of Maryland
Stevenson University
United States Naval Academy
Washington College

Massachusetts 

Assumption University
Bard College at Simon's Rock
Boston College
Bridgewater State College
Clark University
College of the Holy Cross
Curry College
Dean College
Eastern Nazarene College
Elms College
Emerson College
Emmanuel College

Five Colleges (the fifth "college" is the University of Massachusetts Amherst)
Amherst College
Hampshire College
Mount Holyoke College
Smith College
Gordon College
Lesley College
Massachusetts College of Liberal Arts
Merrimack College
Mount Ida College
Regis College
Simmons College
Stonehill College
Wellesley College
Wheaton College

Williams College

Michigan
Adrian College
Albion College
Alma College
Aquinas College
Calvin University
Concordia University
Hillsdale College
Hope College
Kalamazoo College
Madonna University
Olivet College
Rochester College
Siena Heights University

Minnesota 
Augsburg University
Bethany Lutheran College

Carleton College
College of Saint Benedict and Saint John's University
Concordia College
Gustavus Adolphus College
Hamline University
Macalester College
St. Olaf College
University of Minnesota Morris
University of St. Thomas

Mississippi 
Blue Mountain College
Millsaps College
Rust College
Tougaloo College
Mississippi University for Women
William Carey University

Missouri 
Central Methodist University
College of the Ozarks
Columbia College of Missouri
Culver–Stockton College
Drury University
Evangel University
Fontbonne University
Hannibal-LaGrange University
Lindenwood University
Missouri Baptist University
Missouri Valley College
Southwest Baptist University
Stephens College
Truman State University
Westminster College
William Jewell College

Montana
Carroll College
Rocky Mountain College
University of Great Falls

Nebraska 
Dana College (closed July 2010)
Doane College
Hastings College
Midland University
Nebraska Wesleyan University

Nevada 
Sierra Nevada College

New Hampshire 

Colby–Sawyer College
Franklin Pierce University
Granite State College
Keene State College
Magdalen College of the Liberal Arts
New England College
Plymouth State University
Rivier University
Saint Anselm College
Thomas More College of Liberal Arts

New Jersey 
Caldwell College
College of Saint Elizabeth
Drew University
Ramapo College
Saint Peter's University

New Mexico
St. John's College
Santa Fe University of Art and Design (formerly College of Santa Fe )

New York 
Adelphi University
Bard College

Barnard College
Buffalo State College
Canisius College
Cazenovia College
Colgate University
College of Mount Saint Vincent
Daemen University
D'Youville University
Elmira College
Empire State College
Eugene Lang College The New School for Liberal Arts (a division of The New School university)

Hamilton College
Hartwick College
Hobart and William Smith Colleges
Hofstra University
Houghton College
Ithaca College
Keuka College
The King's College
Le Moyne College
Long Island University C.W. Post Campus
Manhattan College
Manhattanville College
Marist College
Marymount Manhattan College
Medaille College
Mercy College
Mount Saint Mary College
Nyack College
Roberts Wesleyan College
St. Bonaventure University
St. John Fisher College
St. Joseph's University
St. Lawrence University
St. Thomas Aquinas College
Sarah Lawrence College
Siena College
Skidmore College
State University of New York at Fredonia
State University of New York at Geneseo
State University of New York at Oneonta
State University of New York at Plattsburgh
State University of New York at Purchase
Union College
United States Military Academy

Vassar College
Wagner College
Wells College
Yeshiva University

North Carolina 
Barton College
Belmont Abbey College
Bennett College
Brevard College
Catawba College

Davidson College
Duke University
Elon University
Greensboro College
Guilford College
High Point University
Lenoir–Rhyne University
Mars Hill College
Meredith College
Montreat College
Mount Olive College
North Carolina Wesleyan College
Peace College
Salem College
University of North Carolina at Asheville
University of North Carolina at Pembroke
University of North Carolina at Wilmington
Wake Forest University
Warren Wilson College

North Dakota
University of Jamestown

Ohio 
Ashland University
Antioch College
Baldwin Wallace University
Bluffton University
Capital University
Cedarville University
College of Mount St. Joseph
College of Wooster
Defiance College
Denison University
Heidelberg University
Hiram College
John Carroll University

Kenyon College
Lake Erie College
Malone University
Marietta College
Miami University
Mount Vernon Nazarene University
Muskingum University

Oberlin College
Ohio Dominican University
Ohio Northern University
Ohio Wesleyan University
Otterbein University
Tiffin University
University of Findlay
University of Mount Union
Urbana University
Wilmington College
Wittenberg University

Oklahoma
Bacone College
Oklahoma Baptist University
Southern Nazarene University
University of Science and Arts of Oklahoma
Oklahoma Wesleyan University

Oregon

George Fox University
Gutenberg College
Lewis & Clark College
Linfield College
Reed College
Southern Oregon University
University of Portland
Warner Pacific University
Western Oregon University
Willamette University

Pennsylvania
Albright College
Allegheny College
Bryn Athyn College

Bryn Mawr College
Bucknell University
Carlow University
Cedar Crest College
Chatham University
Chestnut Hill College
Dickinson College
Elizabethtown College
Franklin & Marshall College
Gannon University
Geneva College
Gettysburg College
Grove City College
Gwynedd-Mercy College

Haverford College
Immaculata University
Juniata College
Keystone College
King's College
La Salle University
Lafayette College
Lebanon Valley College
Lycoming College
Mansfield University of Pennsylvania 
Mercyhurst University
Messiah University
Misericordia University
Moravian College
Muhlenberg College
Point Park University
Rosemont College
Saint Francis University
Saint Vincent College
Susquehanna University

Swarthmore College
Thiel College
University of Scranton
Ursinus College
Washington & Jefferson College
Waynesburg University
Westminster College
Wilson College
York College of Pennsylvania

Rhode Island 
Providence College
Roger Williams University

South Carolina 
Allen University
Benedict College
Charleston Southern University
Coker College
College of Charleston
Columbia College
Converse University
Erskine College
Furman University
Lander University
Limestone College
Morris College
Newberry College
North Greenville University
Presbyterian College
Southern Wesleyan University
Wofford College

South Dakota
Augustana University
John Witherspoon College
Mount Marty College
University of Sioux Falls

Tennessee 

Belmont University
Bethel University
Carson–Newman University
Cumberland University
Fisk University
King University
Lane College
Lee University
Lincoln Memorial University
Lipscomb University
Maryville College
Milligan College
Rhodes College
Sewanee: The University of the South
University of Tennessee Southern (formerly Martin Methodist College)
Tennessee Wesleyan University
Union University

Texas 
Abilene Christian University
Austin College
College of Saint Thomas More
Dallas Baptist University
Hardin-Simmons University
Houston Christian University
Howard Payne University
Midwestern State University
St. Edward's University
St. Mary's University
Schreiner University
Southwestern University
Texas Wesleyan University
Trinity University
University of Dallas
University of the Incarnate Word
University of St. Thomas
Wayland Baptist University

Utah 
Westminster College

Vermont 

Bennington College
Burlington College
Castleton University
Goddard College
Green Mountain College
Johnson State College
Landmark College
Lyndon State College
Marlboro College
Middlebury College
Saint Michael's College
Sterling College

Virginia 

Bluefield College
Bridgewater College
Christendom College
Christopher Newport University
Emory and Henry College
Hampden–Sydney College
Hollins University
Lynchburg College
Mary Baldwin University
Patrick Henry College
Randolph College
Randolph–Macon College
Roanoke College
Shenandoah University
Southern Virginia University
Sweet Briar College
University of Mary Washington
University of Richmond
University of Virginia's College at Wise
Virginia Intermont College
Virginia Wesleyan University
Washington and Lee University

Washington

The Evergreen State College
Gonzaga University
Northwest University
Pacific Lutheran University
St. Martin's University
Seattle Pacific University
Seattle University
University of Puget Sound
University of Washington, Bothell
Western Washington University
Whitman College
Whitworth University

West Virginia
Alderson Broaddus University
Bethany College
Concord University
Davis & Elkins College
Shepherd University
West Virginia Wesleyan College
Wheeling Jesuit University

Wisconsin 

Alverno College
Beloit College
Carroll University
Carthage College
Edgewood College
Lakeland University
Lawrence University
Marian University
Mount Mary University
Northland College
Ripon College
St. Norbert College
University of Wisconsin-Superior
Viterbo University
Wisconsin Lutheran College

Wyoming 
Wyoming Catholic College

See also
Great Books Program
Great Books programs in Canada

References

Further reading

Koblik, Steven and Stephen Richards Graubard. Distinctively American: The Residential Liberal Arts Colleges, 2000.
Pope, Loren. Colleges That Change Lives. New York: Penguin, 2006.

External links
 How To Choose a College That's Right For You - NPR

Lists of universities and colleges in the United States
Universities and colleges in the United States